Rui Miguel Sousa Barbosa (born July 17, 1976 in Barroselas) is a retired Portuguese professional cyclist.

Major results

2000
 3rd Road race, National Road Championships
2001
 1st Stage 5 Troféu Joaquim Agostinho
 4th Overall Volta ao Algarve
2002
 2nd Road race, National Road Championships
 2nd Overall Gran Premio Internacional Mitsubishi MR Cortez
1st Stage 2
 3rd Overall Volta a Portugal
 5th Overall Volta ao Algarve
2003
 1st Stage 2 Gran Premio Internacional Mitsubishi MR Cortez
2004
 10th Overall Volta a Portugal
 10th Overall Tour de Pologne
2005
 9th Overall Vuelta Ciclista de Chile
2006
 3rd Road race, National Road Championships
 6th Overall GP CTT Correios de Portugal
 7th Overall Troféu Joaquim Agostinho
 10th Overall Volta a Portugal
2008
 7th Overall Volta a Portugal
1st Stage 3
2010
 1st  Road race, National Road Championships
 6th Overall Volta a Portugal
2011
 3rd Overall Volta a Portugal
2012
 3rd Overall Volta a Portugal
1st Mountains classification
1st Stage 4
2013
 3rd Overall Volta a Portugal
1st Stage 2
2014
 2nd Overall Volta a Portugal
1st Stage 7
2015
 5th Overall Volta a Portugal
2016 
 9th Overall Volta a Portugal
2017
 1st Stage 6 Volta a Portugal
 1st Mountains classification GP Beiras e Serra da Estrela

References

External links

1976 births
Living people
Portuguese male cyclists
Sportspeople from Lisbon